Going Highbrow is a 1935 American comedy-musical film directed by Robert Florey.  Guy Kibbee and ZaSu Pitts play a newly rich couple, so eager to buy their way into society they hire a waitress to pose as their daughter.

Plot summary

Cast
 Guy Kibbee as Matt Upshaw
 ZaSu Pitts as Mrs. Cora Upshaw
 Edward Everett Horton as Augie Winterspoon
 Ross Alexander as Harley Marsh
 June Martel as Sandy Long
 Gordon Westcott as Sam Long
 Judy Canova as Annie
 Nella Walker as Mrs. Forrester Marsh
 Jack Norton as Sinclair
 Arthur Treacher as Waiter

References

External links

 
 
 
 

1935 films
Films directed by Robert Florey
Warner Bros. films
1935 musical comedy films
American musical comedy films
Films produced by Samuel Bischoff
American black-and-white films
1930s American films